The Monte Mario Observatory (Sede di Monte Mario, literally "Monte Mario Site") is an astronomical observatory and is part of the Rome Observatory (Osservatorio Astronomico di Roma). It is located atop of Monte Mario in Rome, Italy.
This location (12°27'8.4"E ) was used as the prime meridian (rather than Greenwich) for maps of Italy until the 1960s.

See also
 List of astronomical observatories

References
Astronomical observatories in Italy

Monte Mario